Face (stylized in all caps) is the debut studio album by South Korean singer Jimin of BTS. Slated for release on March 24, 2023, it comprises five songs, all co-written by Jimin, and one instrumental. The lead single "Set Me Free Pt. 2" and its accompanying music video preceded the album on March 17. A second single, "Like Crazy", and its music video will be released on the same day as the album.

Background and release 
Korean media outlets first began reporting on Jimin's official solo debut in January 2023. In a livestream on February 10, Jimin confirmed that he had been working on an album and that it would be released in March. The next day, Star News reported that the singer would appear on various South Korean music programs in promotion of the album and perform two songs. Big Hit Music officially announced the album via a Weverse notice on February 21. A 35-second video "featuring ambient music and a series of water droplets spinning out ripples on the surface of water that eventually form the album's title" followed shortly afterwards. A promotion schedule for the album's rollout was shared on February 22, and the preorder period opened later that same day.

The tracklist was unveiled first, on February 23, 2023. The album comprises six tracks. Jimin is credited as a co-writer on five of them, while BTS bandmate RM is credited on three: "Face-Off" and both the Korean and English versions of "Like Crazy". A short video featuring behind-the-scenes footage of Jimin during the creative process of the album was uploaded to YouTube shortly afterwards. Big Hit released a black and white "mood" photo, of Jimin in a mostly empty room—a few pieces of furniture to the forefront are draped in white cloth that covers the entire floor—with his back to the camera as if about to leave, his silhouette illuminated by light from the doorway, on March 7. Two sets of concept photos followed on March 9 and 10 respectively. The "Hardware" version photos featured the singer dressed in a black leather jacket staring directly into the camera, followed by closeups of his face decorated with silver spikes and studs on his brow and cheekbones and a lip piercing on his lower lip, then "seemingly shirtless" with the spikes cascading down the side of his neck and across his collarbone. The "Software" version photos visually contrasted the former, with Jimin presenting a more "natural and pure aura", now dressed in white and seated on a white couch in the room from the mood photo. The accompanying closeup shots revealed a smattering of scars on the right side of his face.

Singles 
"Set Me Free Pt. 2" was released ahead of the album, on March 17, 2023. Its title bears an intentional similarity to "Set Me Free" by BTS bandmate Suga, from his 2020 mixtape D-2, though neither song is actually connected to the other. In an interview with Consequence, published the day of the single's release, Jimin stated that "we weren't trying to divide part one or part two. But since it turns out my song talks about freedom and moving forward, and SUGA's song talks about some of the stories that come before, I thought it would be good to come after that." The song was chosen as the first single off Face due to its intensity and Jimin's wanting to make his solo debut "in an impactful way". Accordingly, the accompanying music video focuses heavily on the performance aspect of the song and its "really intense vibe". In the video, directed by Oui Kim, Jimin acts as the "commanding centerpiece in an elaborate choreography routine" that sees him "mov[ing] across the screen with a mob of dancers, who all perform in unison as the room flashes in waves of light". The singer described the song as having "the energy of a ray of light coming into the darkness... If I had to say specific colors, I'd say black and white."

"Like Crazy" will be released as the album's second single on March 24.

Music and lyrics 
Thematically, the album "delv[es] into Jimin's story of fronting his true self and making a new leap forward as an artist". It also depicts the emotions he experienced over the past few years during the global pandemic. The promotion schedule graphic for Face contained notes such as "Circle of Resonance" and "Reflection of vulnerable minds and unexposed wounds". Accordingly, "Set Me Free Pt. 2", recounts Jimin's "resolution to free himself from various emotions hidden deep inside him"—pain, sorrow, emptiness—with "assertive" lyrics about "freedom and moving forward". The song, which also showcases the singer rapping for the first time, expresses "[the ideas of] determination, passion, and overcoming". Musically, the track features "big horns"; a choir whose recording Jimin flew to the United States to oversee; a "serious", "punchy", "snapping hip-hop" beat; and Auto-tuned vocals.

Track listing

Release history

References 

2023 debut albums
Hybe Corporation albums
Korean-language albums
Upcoming albums